Biarum tenuifolium is a tuberous flowering plant species in the family Araceae.

Taxonomy

Within the genus Biarum, it is the only species in subgenus Biarum.

Subspecies
Six subspecies are generally recognized:
 Biarum tenuifolium subsp. tenuifolium: southern Italy to the southern Balkans.
 Biarum tenuifolium subsp. zelebori: Greece and south-western Turkey.
 Biarum tenuifolium subsp. arundanum: heavy terra rossa soils in Portugal and Spain
 Biarum tenuifolium subsp. galianii: loose sandy soils in south-western Spain.
 Biarum tenuifolium subsp. abbreviatum: Central Mediterranean, from Italy to Greece.
 Biarum tenuifolium subsp. idomenaeum: Crete.

Subspecies arundanum and galianii have also been treated as two independent species (Biarum arundanum and Biarum galianii), or lumped together under Biarum arundanum.

References

External links

Garden plants of Europe
Flora of Europe
tenuifolium